Michael Lynch (born 12 April 1963) is a former Australian cyclist. Lynch competed at the 1984 Summer Olympics in cycling events. He did not finish the men's road race and was placed 14th in the team time trial.

References

1963 births
Living people
Australian male cyclists
Cyclists from Melbourne
Olympic cyclists of Australia
Cyclists at the 1984 Summer Olympics
Commonwealth Games medallists in cycling
Commonwealth Games silver medallists for Australia
Cyclists at the 1982 Commonwealth Games
20th-century Australian people
21st-century Australian people
Medallists at the 1982 Commonwealth Games